Down-low (also "on the down low" or "on the DL") may refer to any activity or relationship kept discreet. It may refer to:

 Down-low (sexual slang), Men who identify as heterosexual but secretly have sex with other men

In music, Down low can refer to:
 Down Low (rap group), rap/hip hop group
 "Down Low (Nobody Has to Know)", the R. Kelly song
 Down Low (album), the Betzefer album
 "On The DL", The Pharcyde song 

In television,
 "The Down Low", Episode 11, Season 6 of House M.D.